Saltness is a hamlet in southwestern Whalsay in the parish of Nesting in the Shetland Islands of Scotland. It lies in the northern part of Symbister, just to the southwest of Hamister.

References

External links

Canmore - William And Robert: Saltness, Whalsay, North Sea site record

Villages in Whalsay